Polina Pavlovna Kutepova (born August 1, 1971, Moscow) is a  Soviet and Russian actress.

Biography 
Along with twin sister Kseniya preparing for an artistic career since childhood. She studied at drama school and film school. He starred in the movie. In 1993, she graduated from  the directing department GITIS (Pyotr Fomenko class). Since 1993 —  the actress of the Moscow's theater   Pyotr Fomenko Workshop.

Family 
 Twin sister — Kseniya Kutepova
 Husband —  Yevgeny Kamenkovich (1954), Soviet and Russian theater director 
 daughter —  Nadezhda (1997)

Awards 
  Honored Artist of the Russian Federation (2004)
 Golden Mask 2010

References

External links
 

1971 births
Living people
Soviet actresses
Soviet child actresses
Russian film actresses
Russian stage actresses
Actresses from Moscow
Honored Artists of the Russian Federation
Gerasimov Institute of Cinematography alumni
Russian television actresses
Russian twins
20th-century Russian actresses
21st-century Russian actresses